James Morrison Wilson Jr. (July 8, 1918 – November 25, 2009) was an official in the United States Department of State who launched the State Department's annual country reports on human rights in 1975, and who served as Assistant Secretary of State for Human Rights and Humanitarian Affairs from 1975 to 1977.

Biography

Wilson was born on July 8, 1918 in Mokansan in Sanmen County, Republic of China.  His parents were American missionaries, and Wilson grew up in Hangzhou and Shanghai.  After the January 28 Incident, his family decided to leave China in 1935, leaving via the Trans-Siberian Railway and traveling through the Soviet Union to Europe, and returning from there to the U.S. Wilson then attended Swarthmore College, graduating with a B.A. in 1939.  He then began postgraduate studies at the Graduate Institute of International Studies in Geneva. After his return to the United States he attended The Fletcher School of Law and Diplomacy, receiving a master's degree in 1940.  

After college, Wilson briefly worked as a newspaper reporter in Louisville, Kentucky and then joined the Kentucky National Guard.  He was on board a ship sailing to Corregidor Island at the time of the Japanese attack on Pearl Harbor.  As a result, Wilson's unit was called up and Wilson spent the rest of World War II in the United States Army. He served in North Africa, Italy, and France, becoming an aide of General Lucian Truscott. By the end of the war, he had obtained the rank of lieutenant colonel and had been awarded the Bronze Star Medal twice and the Purple Heart twice.  

After the war, Wilson attended Harvard Law School, graduating in 1948.  He then joined the United States Department of Defense in Washington, D.C., where he worked to negotiate agreements about U.S. military bases abroad.  In 1957, he transferred to the United States Department of State.  He served in Washington, D.C., Paris, and Madrid.  He became Deputy Chief of Mission at Bangkok in 1964.  He was then Deputy Chief of Mission in Manila from 1966 to 1970.

Wilson returned to Washington, D.C. in 1970, becoming Deputy Assistant Secretary of State for East Asian and Pacific Affairs under Marshall Green.  There, he was almost immediately thrust into the controversy about the Pentagon Papers.  After Wilson suffered a heart attack, he was reassigned to the White House and there led negotiations related to the Trust Territory of the Pacific Islands.  These negotiations resulted in the Northern Mariana Islands becoming a U.S. commonwealth in 1975.

In 1976, President of the United States Gerald Ford named Wilson the first ever Assistant Secretary of State for Human Rights and Humanitarian Affairs.  There, he launched the practice of preparing annual country reports on human rights in various countries around the world.  United States Secretary of State Henry Kissinger initially wanted these reports to remain classified, but the United States Congress insisted that the reports be made public.  

Wilson retired in 1978.  In retirement, he served on the board of the International Rescue Committee. 

Wilson died on November 15, 2009 in Washington, D.C.

References
Patricia Sullivan, "Diplomat set up State's human rights program", Washington Post, Nov. 21, 2009

1918 births
2009 deaths
United States Assistant Secretaries of State
Harvard Law School alumni
Swarthmore College alumni
The Fletcher School at Tufts University alumni
Graduate Institute of International and Development Studies alumni
American expatriates in China